MTV Unplugged NYC 1997 is a live album from R&B artist, Babyface. It includes other performers such as Eric Clapton, Shanice, K-Ci & JoJo, Kevon Edmonds, Melvin Edmonds, Sheila E. and Stevie Wonder.

Track listing

Charts

Weekly charts

Certifications

References

Babyface (musician) albums
MTV Unplugged albums
1997 live albums
Albums recorded at the Hammerstein Ballroom